Goebbels is a German surname, normally found in the western areas of Germany. It is probably derived from the Low German word gobelet.  Notable people with the surname include:

 Heiner Goebbels (born 1952), German composer and music director
 Joseph Goebbels (1897–1945), Propaganda Minister of Nazi Germany
 Magda Goebbels (1901–1945), wife of Joseph Goebbels
 Joseph and Magda Goebbels' 6 Children (murdered 1945)
 Matthias Goebbels (1836–1912), German historicist painter and priest
 Robert Goebbels (born 1944), Luxembourg socialist and vice president of the European Left

See also
Goebbels (disambiguation)
Ronald Goebbel (born 1936), American politician

German-language surnames
Surnames from given names